Anadara brasiliana, common name the incongruous ark clam, is a saltwater clam in the family Arcidae, the ark shells. This species is found along the Atlantic coast of North America, from North Carolina to Brazil.

References

brasiliana
Bivalves described in 1819